Pootsi is a village in Pärnu, Pärnu County, in southwestern Estonia. It has a population of 79 (as of 1 January 2011).

Notable people
Platon (1869–1919, Paul Kulbusch), Orthodox bishop and saint

Gallery

References

Villages in Pärnu County